Aceria nervisequa is a species of mite that belongs to the family Eriophyidae. It is found in Europe and was first described by Giovanni Canestrini in 1891. The mite causes galls on the leaves of beech (Fagus species),

Description of the gall
Aceria nervisequa causes felt-like galls (erinea) on the underside of the leaves of European beech (Fagus sylvatica), copper beech) (Fagus sylvatica purpurea) and Crimean beech (Fagus x taurica). The erinea are white at first, turning pink and than brown by the autumn while on copper beech the erinea are pink, bright crimson or purple. The mites also cause erinea along the veins on the upper side of the leaf which were initially thought to be a separate species; known as Aceria faginea. The mites spend the winter in bark crevices or in buds.

Inquilines
Aceria maculifer may be an inquiline of A. nervisequa.

Note

Distribution
Found in Europe, including Bosnia and Herzegovina, Croatia, Czech Republic, Denmark, France, Germany, Great Britain (common), Ireland, Italy, Kosovo, Latvia, Luxembourg, Montenegro, Netherlands, North Macedonia, Poland and Serbia.

References

Eriophyidae
Animals described in 1891
Arachnids of Europe
Galls
Taxa named by Giovanni Canestrini